The Daylamites or Dailamites (Middle Persian: Daylamīgān;  Deylamiyān) were an Iranian people inhabiting the Daylam—the mountainous regions of northern Iran on the southwest coast of the Caspian Sea, now comprising the southeastern half of Gilan Province.

The Daylamites were warlike people skilled in close combat. They were employed as soldiers during the Sasanian Empire and in the subsequent Muslim empires. Daylam and Gilan were the only regions to successfully resist the Muslim conquest of Persia, albeit many Daylamite soldiers abroad accepted Islam. In the 9th century many Daylamites adopted Zaidi Islam. In the 10th century some adopted Isma'ilism, then in the 11th century Fatimid Isma'ilism and subsequently Nizari Isma'ilism. Both the Zaidis and the Nizaris maintained a strong presence in Iran up until the 16th century rise of the Safavids who espoused the Twelver sect of Shia Islam. In the 930s, the Daylamite Buyid dynasty emerged and managed to gain control over much of modern-day Iran, which it held until the coming of the Seljuk Turks in the mid-11th century.

Origins and language

The Daylamites lived in the highlands of Daylam, part of the Alborz range, between Tabaristan and Gilan. However, the earliest Zoroastrian and Christian sources indicate that the Daylamites originally arrived from eastern Anatolia near the Tigris, where Iranian ethnolinguistic groups, including Zazas, live today.

They spoke the Daylami language, a now-extinct Northwestern Iranian language similar to that of the neighbouring Gilites. During the Sasanian Empire, they were employed as high-quality infantry. According to the Byzantine historians Procopius and Agathias, they were a warlike people and skilled in close combat, being armed each with a sword, a shield, and spears or javelins.

History

Pre-Islamic period

Seleucid and Parthian period
The Daylamites first appear in historical records in the late 2nd century BCE, where they are mentioned by Polybius, who erroneously calls them "Elamites" instead of "Daylamites". In the Middle Persian prose Kar-Namag i Ardashir i Pabagan, the last ruler of the Parthian Empire, Artabanus V (r. 208–224) summoned all the troops from Ray, Damavand, Daylam, and Padishkhwargar to fight the newly established Sasanian Empire. According to the Letter of Tansar, during this period, Daylam, Gilan, and Ruyan belonged to the kingdom of Gushnasp, who was a Parthian vassal but later submitted to the first Sasanian emperor Ardashir I (r. 224–242).

Sasanian period

The descendants of Gushnasp were still ruling until in ca. 520, when Kavadh I (r. 488-531) appointed his eldest son, Kawus, as the king of the former lands of the Gushnaspid dynasty. In 522, Kavadh I sent an army under a certain Buya (known as Boes in Byzantine sources) against Vakhtang I of Iberia. This Buya was a native of Daylam, which is proven by the fact that he bore the title wahriz, a Daylamite title also used by Khurrazad, the Daylamite military commander who conquered Yemen in 570 during the reign of Khosrow I (r. 531-579), and his Daylamite troops would later play a significant role in the conversion of Yemen to the nascent Islam. The 6th-century Byzantine historian Procopius described the Daylamites as;

"barbarians who live...in the middle of Persia, but have never become subject to the king of the Persians. For their abode is on sheer mountainsides which are altogether inaccessible, and so they have continued to be autonomous from ancient times down to the present day; but they always march with the Persians as mercenaries when they go against their enemies. And they are all foot-soldiers, each man carrying a sword and shield and three javelins in his hand (De Bello Persico 8.14.3-9)."

The equipment of the Dailamites of the Sasanian army included swords, shield, battle-axe (tabar-zīn), slings, daggers, pikes, and two-pronged javelins (zhūpīn).

Daylamites also took part in the siege of Archaeopolis in 552. They supported the rebellion of Bahrām Chōbin against Khosrow II, but he later employed an elite detachment of 4000 Daylamites as part of his guard. They also distinguished themselves at the Yemeni campaign of Wahriz and in the battles against the forces of Justin II.

Some Muslim sources maintain that following the Sasanian defeat in the Battle of al-Qādisiyyah, the 4000-strong Daylamite contingent of the Sasanian guard, along with other Iranian units, defected to the Arab side, converting to Islam.

Islamic period

Resistance to the Arabs

The Daylamites managed to resist the Arab invasion of their own mountainous homeland for several centuries under their own local rulers. Warfare in the region was endemic, with raids and counter-raids by both sides. Under the Arabs, the old Iranian fortress-city of Qazvin continued in its Sasanian-era role as a bulwark against Daylamite raids. According to the historian al-Tabari, Daylamites and Turkic peoples were considered the worst enemies of the Arab Muslims. The Abbasid Caliphate penetrated the region and occupied parts of it, but their control was never very effective.

Shortly after 781, the Nestorian monk Shubhalishoʿ began evangelizing the Daylamites and converting them to Christianity. He and his associates made only a little headway before encountering competition from Islam. During the reign of Harun al-Rashid (r. 785–809), several Shia Muslims fled to the largely pagan Daylamites, with a few Zoroastrians and Christians, to escape persecution. Among these refugees were some Alids, who began the gradual conversion of the Daylamites to Shia Islam. Nevertheless, a strong Iranian identity remained ingrained in the peoples of the region, along with an anti-Arab mentality. Local rulers such as the Buyids and the Ziyarids, made a point of celebrating old Iranian and Zoroastrian festivals.

The Daylamite expansion

From the 9th century onwards, Daylamite foot-soldiers began to comprise an important element of the armies in Iran.

In the mid 9th century, the Abbasid Caliphate increased its need for mercenary soldiers in the Royal Guard and the army, thus they began recruiting Daylamites, who at the period were not as strong in numbers as the Turks, Khorasanis, the Farghanis, and the Egyptian tribesmen of the Maghariba. From 912/3 to 916/7, a Daylamite soldier, Ali ibn Wahsudhan, was chief of police (ṣāḥib al-shurṭa) in Isfahan during the reign of al-Muqtadir (r. 908–929). For many decades, "it remained customary for the Caliph's personal guards to include the Daylamites as well as the ubiquitous Turks". The Buyid amīrs, who were Daylamite themselves, supplemented their army of Daylamite infantrymen with Turkic cavalrymen. Daylamites were among the people comprising the Seljuq army, and Ghaznavids also employed them as elite infantry.

Islamic sources record their characteristic painted shields and two-pronged short spears (in  zhūpīn; in  mizrāq) which could be used either for thrusting or for hurling as a javelin. Their characteristic battle tactic was advancing with a shield wall and using their spears and battle-axes from behind.

Culture

Religion 
The Daylamites were most likely adherents of some form of Iranian paganism, while a minority of them were Zoroastrian and Nestorian Christian. According to al-Biruni, the Daylamites and Gilites "lived by the rule laid down by the mythical Afridun." The Church of the East had spread among them due to the activities of John of Dailam, and bishoprics are reported in the remote area as late as the 790s, while it is possible that some remnants survived there until the 14th century.

Names 

The name of the king Muta sounds uncommon, but when in the 9th and 10th centuries Daylamite chieftains appear in the spotlight in massive numbers, their names are undoubtedly pagan Iranian, not of the south-western "Persian" type, but of the north-western type: thus Gōrāngēj (not Kūrānkīj, as originally interpreted) corresponds to Persian gōr-angēz "chaser of wild asses", Shēr-zil to Shēr-dil "lion’s heart", etc. The medieval Persian geographer Estakhri differentiates between Persian and Daylami and comments that in the highlands of Daylam there was a tribe that spoke a language different from that of Daylam and Gilan, perhaps a surviving non-Iranian language.

Customs, equipment and appearance 
Many habits and customs of the Daylamites have been recorded in historical records. Their men were strikingly tough and capable of lasting terrible privations. They were armed with javelins and battle axes, and had tall shields painted in gray colours. In battle, they would usually form a wall with their shields against the attackers. Some Daylamites would use javelins with burning naphtha. A poetic portrayal of Daylamite armed combat is present in Fakhruddin As'ad Gurgani's Vis and Rāmin. A major disadvantage of the Daylamites was the low amount of cavalry that they had, which compelled them to work with Turkic mercenaries.

The Daylamites exaggeratedly mourned over their dead, and even over themselves in failure. In 963, the Buyid ruler of Iraq, Mu'izz al-Dawla, popularized Mourning of Muharram in Baghdad, which may have played a part in the evolution of the ta'zieh.

Estakhri describes the Daylamites as a bold but inconsiderate people, being thin in appearance and having fluffy hair. They practised agriculture and had herds, but only a few horses. They also grew rice, fished, and produced silk textiles. According to al-Muqaddasi, the Daylamites were handsome and had beards. According to the author of the Hudud al-'Alam, the Daylamite women took part in agriculture like men. According to Rudhrawari, they were "equals of men in strength of mind, force of character, and participation in the management of affairs." Furthermore, the Daylamites also strictly practised endogamy.

See also
 Rudkhan Castle
 Alamut Castle
 Lambsar Castle
 Fayruz Al Daylami
 Al-Daylami

References

Sources
 
 
 

 
 
 
 
 
 

 
 
 

 
Historical Iranian peoples
History of Talysh